Bastiaan "Bas" Belder (born 25 October 1946) is a Dutch politician and former Member of the European Parliament (MEP) from the Netherlands. He is a member of the Staatkundig Gereformeerde Partij, part of the European Conservatives and Reformists.
 
He sat on the European Parliament's Committee on Foreign Affairs. He was a substitute for the Committee on Agriculture. Furthermore he was vice-chairman of the delegation for the relations between the European Parliament and Israel and chairman of the European Parliament Working Group on Human Dignity.

In the 2019 European Parliament election he was succeeded by Bert-Jan Ruissen.

Education 
 Higher degree in the history of Eastern Europe from Utrecht University

Career 
 1969–1984: Secondary school teacher (Rotterdam)
 1984–1999: Foreign editor/commentator Reformatorisch Dagblad (Apeldoorn)
 1999–2019: Member of the European Parliament
 1999–2004: First Chairman of the Delegation for relations with the United States
 2009–2014: Chairman of the Delegation for the relations with Israel
 2014–2019: Vice-Chairman of the Delegation for the relations with Israel

Personal life 
Bas Belder is married and has three children. He is a member of the Protestant Church in the Netherlands (PKN).

See also 
 1999 European Parliament election in the Netherlands
 2004 European Parliament election in the Netherlands
 2009 European Parliament election in the Netherlands
 2014 European Parliament election in the Netherlands

References 

  Parlement.com biography

External links 

 
 

1946 births
Living people
Dutch schoolteachers
20th-century Dutch historians
Dutch journalists
MEPs for the Netherlands 1999–2004
MEPs for the Netherlands 2004–2009
MEPs for the Netherlands 2009–2014
MEPs for the Netherlands 2014–2019
People from Ridderkerk
Protestant Church Christians from the Netherlands
Reformed Political Party MEPs
Reformed Political Party politicians
Utrecht University alumni
European Christian Political Movement politicians